Scalby railway station was a railway station on the Scarborough & Whitby Railway.

History
The station opened on 16 July 1885, and served the village of Scalby. It was situated immediately north of Scalby Viaduct and had a single platform, a goods bay, and another siding.

The station closed to regular traffic on 2 March 1953, the station building was then converted into a camping cottage. Two camping coaches were positioned here by the North Eastern Region from 1954 to 1956 and four coaches were here from 1957 until 1964. Occasional trains stopped for users of these facilities until final closure in 1964, Quick (2022) notes that two or three trains each way had definite calls in the working timetable of June 1961.

In 1974 the station was completely demolished, and a road called Chichester Close has been built on the site since. Some of the stonework has been reused as corner stones, embedded in the brickwork, of houses in this street.

Scalby Viaduct still stands, and has four spans of  each.

Accidents and incidents
On 24 April 1956 a locomotive was derailed when the track spread under it during shunting. An instruction banning heavy locomotives from the goods yard had been forgotten.

References

Further reading

External links
 Scalby station on navigable 1947 O. S. map

Disused railway stations in the Borough of Scarborough
Former North Eastern Railway (UK) stations
Railway stations in Great Britain opened in 1885
Railway stations in Great Britain closed in 1953